The Akola–Kacheguda Intercity Express is an Express train of South Central Railway zone, which runs between the cities of Akola, the major industrial & agricultural city of Maharashtra and Hyderabad, the capital city of Telangana, India. The train primarily runs on Secunderabad–Manmad section.

Arrival and departure
Train no.17640 departs from Akola Jn (AK), daily at 09:30 hrs. from platform no.5 reaching Kacheguda (KCG) at 20:15  hrs.
Train no.17639 departs from Kacheguda, daily at 7:30, reaching Akola, at 18:00.

Locomotive
The Akola–Kacheguda Intercity Express is hauled by WDM-2 or WDM-3A of GTL (Guntakal) shed.

Rake composition
The rake composition is LOCO-SLR-GEN-GEN-GEN-C1-D1-D2-GEN-GEN-GEN-GEN-GEN-GEN-GEN-GEN-SLR.

Route and halts
 AK 	Akola Junction
 WHM 	Washim
 HNL 	Hingoli Deccan
 BMF 	Basmat
 PAU 	Purna Junction
 NED 	
 MUE 	
 UMRI 	Umri
 DAB 	Dharmabad
 BSX 	Basar
 NZB 	
 KMC 	Kamareddi
 AKE 	Akanapet
 MZL 	Mirzapali
 WDR 	Wadiaram
 MED 	Medchal
 GWV 	Gowdavalli
 BMO 	Bolarum
 MJF 	Malkajgiri
 STPD Sitafal Mandi
 KCG 	Kacheguda Hyderabad

See also
 Ajanta Express
 Nizamabad–Kacheguda DEMU

References

Rail transport in Telangana
Rail transport in Maharashtra
Intercity Express (Indian Railways) trains
Transport in Hyderabad, India